"Oakland," also known as the James M. Stephenson House, is a home located in Parkersburg, Wood County, West Virginia. Although a slaveholder and sympathizing with the Confederacy, Stephenson was also married to the sister of Unionist Arthur Boreman, and allowed then Union Army Col. (later Gen.) James B. Steedman to use his grove nearby during the American Civil War. However, Union cavalry units occupied this his mansion for a time nonetheless, and damaged furnishings as well as the home and garden.

It was built in 1840, and is a two-story, "L"-shaped, red brick house in the Greek Revival style. It features a low hipped roof with cupola and a single bay, one-story portico with paired, fluted wooden Doric order columns.
It was listed on the National Register of Historic Places in 1979. It was donated to the WVU Parkersburg Foundation in 2015.

References

External links

Houses in Parkersburg, West Virginia
Houses on the National Register of Historic Places in West Virginia
Historic American Buildings Survey in West Virginia
Greek Revival houses in West Virginia
Houses completed in 1840
National Register of Historic Places in Wood County, West Virginia